is a public aerodrome located  southeast of the village of Niijima, on the island of Niijima, one of the Izu Islands in the Philippine Sea, south of the Izu Peninsula, Japan. Niijima Village is part of Greater Metropolitan Tokyo, and the airport is operated by the Tokyo Municipal Government.

History

Niijima Airport was opened in 1970 by the Niijima Village government. Regularly scheduled flights from Niijima to Chofu Airport in western Tokyo began in March 1979.
It was granted a construction permit in 1984 to be upgraded to a national-standard tertiary airport, and construction was completed in 1987. A runway lighting system was installed in 1994.

Airlines and destinations

Ground Transportation
 There is a bus stop which is passed through a route bus ふれあいバス - Fureai Bus near to the airport. The bus stop is named as 健康センター - Kenko Center, and it takes about ten minutes from the airport to the bus stop on foot.

References

Airports in Tokyo
Transport in the Greater Tokyo Area
Izu Islands